The Hope Division is the third release by American hardcore punk band Stick to Your Guns.

Track listing

Personnel
 Jesse Barnett – lead vocals, additional guitars, piano, lyrics
 Reid Haymond – lead guitar, backing vocals
 Chris Rawson – rhythm guitar, backing vocals
 Andrew Rose – bass, backing vocals
 George Schmitz – drums, backing vocals

Critical reception
The NewReview gave the album a 4.5 out of 5 and states "just because Stick to Your Guns sing songs of hope, don't mistake The Hope Division for a cowardly, meek album. It's energy driven, full of heart, infectious and intent on motivating you to fight the injustice of a selfish world."

References

2010 albums
Stick to Your Guns (band) albums
Sumerian Records albums